Gondo may refer to:

 Gondo, Central African Republic
 Gondo is a village in the municipality of Zwischbergen, Valais
 the Gondo, a Malian variant of the Dongola horse
 Gondō Station, a railway station in Nagano, Japan